Newegg Commerce, Inc. is an American online retailer of items including computer hardware and consumer electronics. It is based in City of Industry, California. It is majority-owned by Liaison Interactive, a multinational technology company.

History

Early years and growth

The company was founded by Fred Chang, a U.S. immigrant from Taiwan, in 2001. "Newegg" was selected as the company name to signify new hope for e-commerce during a period when e-commerce businesses were struggling to survive.

In 2004, Newegg established Rosewill as a private-label reseller of computing and household products from many manufacturers.

In 2005, Newegg.com was named one of the Internet's Top 10 retailers by Internet Retailer Magazine, with a 2004 sales revenue of just under $1 billion. Newegg.com grew an additional 30% in 2005, bringing annual sales to approximately $1.3 billion. Newegg launched NeweggMall.com in July 2008, Newegg.ca in October 2008, and NeweggBusiness.com in August 2009.

Chang had been Newegg's chairman and CEO until August 1, 2008, when it was announced he would step down as CEO and chairman while remaining a member of the board of directors and executive committee. He was succeeded by Tally Liu. Chang also retained his position as president of Newegg's Chinese operations.

Attempted 2009 IPO and Newegg Marketplace
On September 28, 2009, Newegg Inc filed for an IPO (initial public offering) with the U.S. Securities and Exchange Commission. The filing stated that Newegg has been profitable every year since 2001 and generated sales of $2.1 billion in 2008. The company's largest outside shareholder is New York-based venture-capital firm Insight Venture Partners. The IPO was managed by JP Morgan, Bank of America, Merrill Lynch ,and Citi. In 2011, the company withdrew its registration for filing for an IPO, saying it would continue to explore alternative options for funding.

It launched Newegg Marketplace in 2010 and exceeded $2.5 billion in revenue that year. The company has more than 1,500 employees.

In 2010, Liu departed, and Chang became CEO again.

Subsequent expansion
On June 15, 2017, during London Tech Week, Newegg announced a global expansion plan to serve key parts of Asia Pacific, Europe, Latin America, and the Middle East. Once complete, the online retailer is expected to reach customers in a total of 50 countries. On November 2, 2017, the company announced key global milestones, including localized payment options, enhanced customer service, and a greater product selection for its international customers.

Liaison Interactive buyout and SPAC merger
In 2016, Liaison Interactive, a Chinese technology company, acquired a majority stake in Newegg in an investment deal. In 2020, Newegg entered into a merger agreement with Lianlou Smart Limited (NASDAQ: LLIT), a special-purpose acquisition company, wherein Newegg stockholders became majority owners of LLIT. Following the consummation of the merger, Newegg was listed as a publicly traded company on Nasdaq (NASDAQ: NEGG) in May 2021 as Newegg Commerce, Inc.

Services 
In November 2016, Newegg announced a new checkout feature that lets Newegg.com customers choose to have their package held for pickup at one of more than 2,500 FedEx Corp. locations, including 1,800 FedEx retail stores.

In January 2017, Indiegogo and Newegg announced a partnership whereby Newegg provides select crowdfunding campaigns with social exposure; guidance on go-to-market and sales strategies; and assistance with order fulfillment, shipping, and logistical options to help get their products into customer’s hands quickly and efficiently.

In May 2017, Newegg formally rolled out Newegg Logistics, designed to help B2C and B2B e-commerce sellers and other organizations streamline order fulfillment, shipment, and returns.

In October 2017, Newegg unveiled Newegg Now, a weekly Livestream featuring tech commentary and reviews, as well as time-sensitive deals available exclusively during each Newegg Now broadcast.

In February 2019, Newegg announced a program called Newegg online work, Employees interested in part-time work are randomly selected to make purchases.

In May 2020, Newegg formally launched a direct-to-consumer (D2C) initiative to help its vendor partners maximize their reach within the Newegg platform.

In June 2020, Newegg introduced the Newegg PC Builder, an online configurator that lets customers configure and source all the components needed to build a custom PC. While the June 2020 release was limited to customers in North America, in August 2020, the company expanded the configurator to the countries it serves in Europe, Asia Pacific, Latin America, and the Middle East.

In February 2021, Newegg announced a program called Newegg Shuffle, where consumers interested in hot tech devices are chosen at random to make a purchase.

In May 2021, Newegg launched an automotive category offering with a vehicle-specific year/make/model/options navigation interface.

In June 2022, Newegg debuted Gaming PC Finder, a personalization tool to evaluate gaming PC specs, components, and performance options.

In July 2022, Newegg launched JustGPU.com, a research and e-commerce site dedicated to graphics cards. The site allows customers to evaluate, review and compare GPU details to consider a purchase.

Newegg offers services to its third-party logistics (3PL) clients and other e-commerce companies. In April 2020, Newegg announced Newegg Staffing, a staffing agency serving the logistics, manufacturing, clerical, and supply chain management industries. In August 2020, the company expanded its in-house staffing agency to the Midwest and East Coast with new locations in Indianapolis, Indiana, and Edison, New Jersey. And in June 2020, Newegg established Newegg Bridge, which provides customer service management and social media monitoring to its 3PL clients.

Controversies
In March 2010, Newegg sold 300 counterfeit Intel Core i7-920 CPUs. The problem was first exposed by a member of the website HardOCP who posted on the site's forum about receiving the fake CPU. Newegg at first released a statement saying that the processors were "demo units", but later said that they discovered that the processors were actually counterfeit and that the company was terminating its relationship with one supplier in response. The company offered replacement units to the customers who received counterfeit processors, while Intel stated that they had been made aware of the problem and were investigating as well.

In early 2018, customers in the state of Connecticut were notified that Newegg had not collected state sales tax due on out-of-state purchases in the past three years. Newegg was given a choice of collecting such tax in the future or turning over customer information to the state's Department of Revenue Services, which would require customers to file a sales tax form for the past three years of purchases. Newegg chose to furnish the customer information; as Newegg did not have a physical presence in Connecticut, Newegg believed it did not need to collect state sales tax from the ruling in Quill Corp. v. North Dakota. Connecticut's Department of Revenue Services later issued tax bills to these customers.

In September 2018, Newegg announced that malicious code had been placed on their servers for over a month, allowing hackers to access customers' credit card information upon checkout.

In February 2022, the YouTube channel Gamers Nexus uploaded a video detailing business practices in regard to Newegg's RMA department. The video explains that Newegg shipped a motherboard to Steve Burke of Gamers Nexus, which he returned without opening the box due to him not needing a motherboard anymore. Newegg claimed it was damaged and refused to refund the product. The video has been viewed over 1 million times as of Feb. 15, 2022. After the video was posted, other customers and YouTube channels, such as UFD Tech, came forward with other complaints. This resulted in Newegg issuing an apology and changing its open-box RMA policy.

Gaming and esports 
Newegg has sponsored gaming tournaments for titles including Counter-Strike, Warcraft III , and Rome: Total War. Newegg had a monthly case mod contest in 2005 in which contestants submitted pictures, descriptions, and directions describing how to personalize their computers with esoteric appearances and functions.

In March 2019, esports entertainment company Allied Esports named Newegg a founding partner and the official e-commerce partner of the HyperX Esports Arena in Las Vegas, Nevada. In June 2019, Newegg and Allied Esports co-hosted the Triple Crown Royale at the HyperX Esports Arena Las Vegas. Participants competed in three popular titles: Apex Legends, Fortnite, and PlayerUnknown's Battlegrounds (PUBG). The competition gave select members of the public the opportunity to compete against professional players from Counter Logic Gaming (CLG), including Marksman & Psalm from the CLG Fortnite team, and Emy & GooseBreeder from the CLG CS: GO, Red team. In January 2020, Counter Logic Gaming announced an expanded partnership with Newegg as CLG's presenting partner and online technology retail partner for its North American League of Legends Championship Series (LCS) team.

In October 2020, Newegg relaunched its hardware subsidiary ABS to focus on the gaming community. ABS (also known as Advanced Battlestations) offers a full range of gaming PCs for everyone from beginners to advanced video game enthusiasts.

Litigation
On February 10, 2010, Newegg was sued by three former employees accusing it of numerous labor and business cases of abuse, such as violating "a slew of labor laws, overworking and abusing immigrant workers, and ordering employees to hack into competitors' computer systems". In an official statement denying the claims in the lawsuit, the company stated:

Newegg is aware of the allegations made by two former employees and a former consultant. Newegg has always taken pride in the fairness of our labor and hiring practices and to ethical business practices toward our competitors, vendors, and most of all, our valued customers. We have always been fully committed to compliance with all applicable laws and regulations. Accordingly, we strongly deny the assertions made by the individuals filing this lawsuit and intend to defend ourselves vigorously and thoroughly against claims that have neither merit nor basis in fact.

Patent troll cases
Newegg has become known as a company that fights "patent trolls".

In January 2013, Newegg won a victory over Soverain Software when the Court of Appeals for the Federal Circuit overturned the district court ruling in favor of Soverain and invalidated a shopping cart patent by citing prior art from 1984, CompuServe’s Electronic Mall. On January 13th, 2014, the Supreme Court refused Soverain Software's petition for a writ of certiorari to rehear a January 2013 decision of the Court of Appeals, effectively ending Soverain's case.

In November 2013, Newegg lost a case in Texas against TQP Development over Newegg's use of https:// protocol mixing SSL and RC4. Whitfield Diffie and Ron Rivest, the inventors of public-key cryptography and RC4 encryption respectively, testified for Newegg.

On July 6, 2015, after 20 months of waiting, Newegg filed an extraordinary petition urging US District Judge Rodney Gilstrap to issue judgment so that they would be able to file an appeal.  On July 15, 2015, Gilstrap ruled that Newegg did not infringe on a patent belonging to TQP Development.

Awards

Newegg has been the recipient of various awards, including:

 Computer Shopper Shoppers' Choice Awards: 2011, 2008, 2007, 2006, 2005, 2004, 2003
 Forbes.com Best of the Web

References

External links 

 

2001 establishments in California
American companies established in 2001
Companies based in the City of Industry, California
Consumer electronics retailers in the United States
Deal of the day services
Online retailers of the United States
Retail companies established in 2001
Companies listed on the Nasdaq
Computer companies of the United States